Now with Tom Brokaw and Katie Couric, shortened to Now, is an American news magazine that aired on NBC from 1993 to 1994. It was hosted by Tom Brokaw and Katie Couric. The show was eventually merged into Dateline NBC.

References

External links
 

1993 American television series debuts
1994 American television series endings
1990s American television news shows
NBC original programming